Orange Book may refer to:
 Trusted Computer System Evaluation Criteria, a computer security standard
 We Can Conquer Unemployment, 1929 manifesto by David Lloyd George and the Liberal Party
 The Orange Book: Reclaiming Liberalism, by members of the British Liberal Democrat party
 Approved Drug Products with Therapeutic Equivalence Evaluations, published by the FDA's Center for Drug Evaluation and Research
 The IUPAC Compendium of Analytical Nomenclature informally known as the Orange Book
 One of the compact disc standards collections in the Rainbow Books series
 Orange-Book-Standard, issued in 2009 by the German Federal Court of Justice on the interaction between patent law and standards
 Orange Book, a local area networking protocol based on the Cambridge Ring and one of the UK Coloured Book protocols
 Handbook of Directives and Permitted Conventions for the English Bridge Union 
 A book about OpenGL Shading Language

See also
 The Orange Box
 Black Book (disambiguation)
 Blue book
Blue Book (disambiguation)
 Green Book (disambiguation)
 Orange Book (disambiguation)
 Pink Book (disambiguation)
 Plum Book
 White book (disambiguation)
 Yellow Book (disambiguation)